The Michigan Leadership Studies were the well-known series of leadership studies that commenced at the University of Michigan in the 1950s by Rensis Likert, with the objective of identifying the principles and types of leadership styles that led to greater productivity and enhanced job satisfaction among workers. The studies identified two broad leadership styles – an employee orientation and a production orientation. They also identified three critical characteristics of effective leaders – task-oriented behavior, relationship-oriented behavior and participative leadership. The studies concluded that an employee orientation rather than a production orientation, coupled with general instead of close supervision, led to better results. The Michigan leadership studies, along with the Ohio State University studies that took place in the 1940s, are two of the best-known behavioral leadership studies and continue to be cited to this day.

See also 
 Industrial and organizational psychology
 Organizational studies
 Leadership
 Charisma
 Trait Theory
 Management Systems

References

http://changingminds.org/disciplines/leadership/actions/michigan.htm
Industrial and organizational psychology
Political science terminology
Leadership
Social concepts
University of Michigan